The banker's lamp is a style of electric desk or table lamp often characterized by a brass stand, green glass lamp shade, and pull-chain switch. 
Such a lamp was first patented in the United States under the Emeralite brand name. These types of lamp are frequently used in libraries throughout the United States, which have made the lamp popular through their presence in films and TV series. Other examples can feature different colours of glass, and alternate switch types.

History
The first patent for a banker's lamp was filed on 11 May 1909 by Harrison D. McFaddin, and were produced and sold under the brand name Emeralite ("emerald" and "light"). Emeralite lamp shades were produced by the J. Schreiber & Neffen factory located in the city of Rapotín, Moravia. Later competitors were sold as "Greenalite", "Verdelite", and "Amronlite".

A British version of  the banker's lamp was  filed for a patent in 1929, which, instead of a glass shade, has a solid brass shade or reflector.  In addition, the positions of both the pedestal and the shade are adjustable. Examples are commonly seen on the second-hand market.

See also
Green eyeshade
Tiffany lamp

References

Glass art
Industrial design
Light fixtures
Types of lamp